Orville B. Smidt (born June 7, 1943) is an American former politician. He served in the South Dakota House of Representatives from 1999 to 2005 and in the Senate from 2005 to 2009.

References

1943 births
Living people
People from Brookings, South Dakota
Republican Party members of the South Dakota House of Representatives
Republican Party South Dakota state senators